Narsi Bhagat is a Bollywood devotional biopic film directed by Vijay Bhatt, released in 1940. The film, based on Gujarat's famous saint-poet Narsinh Mehta, contains his most popular bhajan, "Vaishno Jan To Tene Kahiye Je Peed Parayi Jane Re", which was also the favourite of Mahatma Gandhi.

Cast
Vishnupant Pagnis as Narasinh Mehta
Durga Khote as Manekbai
Pande as Sarangadhar
V. Adikhar  		
Vimala Vasishta 			
Amirbai Karnataki 			
Ram Marathe 		
Baby Indira

References

External links
 

1940 films
1940s Hindi-language films
Indian biographical films
Films directed by Vijay Bhatt
Indian black-and-white films
1940s biographical films